Theodore Delavan Wilson (also Theodore Delevan Wilson) (11 May 1840 – 29 June 1896) was an American naval ship designer, constructor and instructor of naval architecture and shipbuilding. As chief constructor for the Bureau of Construction and Repair from 1882 to 1892, he was in charge of all new warship design for the United States Navy. Through his efforts, the Navy began its transition out of a post–Civil War slump to become a modern naval power. Warships he designed include the pre-dreadnought battleship , whose destruction in Havana, Cuba, in 1898 precipitated the Spanish–American War.

Life and career
Born in New York City, Wilson apprenticed at the Brooklyn Navy Yard under Naval Constructor B.F. Delano. At the outbreak of the American Civil War, he volunteered for U.S. Army service and served as a non–commissioned officer in the 13th New York Regiment. Upon his return from the front in August 1861, he was transferred to the U.S. Navy and was appointed as a carpenter in the construction department. On the Cambridge he participated in the first day of the Battle of Hampton Roads against the ironclad CSS Virginia.

In 1863, Wilson was ordered on special duty to the Brooklyn Navy Yard to help direct the construction, repair and alteration of various vessels. Three years later, he passed the required examination and was commissioned an assistant naval constructor; he eventually served at naval facilities in Pensacola, Philadelphia and Washington DC. Between 1869 and 1873, he taught naval architecture and shipbuilding at the United States Naval Academy in Annapolis, Maryland. In 1870, Wilson was sent on special duty to Great Britain and France. In Britain, he viewed vessels recently completed and under construction and toured shipbuilding and armor rolling mills. In 1873, he was promoted to naval constructor.

After Annapolis, Wilson served at the Portsmouth Navy Yard and in 1881 was appointed onto the first Naval Advisory Board for rehabilitating and modernizing the Navy. However, he, the two other naval constructors on the panel and Chief Engineer Benjamin Isherwood, dissented with the majority on its recommendations. Those were for a renewed construction of warships that would allow the Navy to take advantage of technological advances such as steel construction, help resuscitate the national economy and develop a large domestic industrial base that could support a large fleet. His dissent may have been due to limitations of domestic industry at the time, without taking into account that domestic industrial modernization had become a major goal of the Navy.

Promoted to chief constructor of the Bureau of Construction and Repair in 1882, Wilson was placed in charge of naval design for all new warships. Wilson's reputation in foreign naval circles was considerable.

Wilson tendered his resignation from the Navy in 1893 due to failing health and was instead granted two years' leave; he resumed his duties at the Boston Navy Yard in 1895. He died of heat stroke the following year while supervising the undocking of the monitor .

Honors
Wilson was an honorary member of the Royal Institution of Naval Architects in Great Britain. He was the first American to be elected to this organization. He was also a member of several scientific societies, the Loyal Legion, the Grand Army of the Republic and the Naval Order of the United States.

Patents
In 1870, Wilson patented a marine "air port," which became standard use in naval and merchant marine ships. Ten years later, he patented a bolt extractor which also went into general use.

Ships designed by Wilson (partial list)

Books by Wilson
 Shipbuilding, Theoretical and Practical (New York: John Wiley & Son, 1873). This book was adopted as a textbook by the Naval Academy.
 Steel Ships of the U.S. Navy (Deutsch Litho. & Prtg. Co., 1893)

References

Bibliography
 Author not listed, "Wilson, Theodore Develan." In The Encyclopedia Americana, Volume 16 (1904). Retrieved 4 Apr 2012.
 "Obituary Record, Theodore Delevan Wilson." In The New York Times, 30 Jun 1896. Retrieved 4 Apr 2012.
 Friedman, Norman, U.S. Cruisers: An Illustrated Design History (Naval Institute Press, 1984). .
 Friedman, Norman, U.S. Destroyers: An Illustrated Design History (Naval Institute Press, 2003). . Retrieved 5 Apr 2012.
 Wilson, Theodore D., "414. Report of Naval Constructor Theodore D. Wilson on British Dockyards," 16 Nov 1870. In Inventory of the Naval Records Collection of the Office of Naval Records and Library, in Record Group 45. Retrieved 5 April 2012.

External links
 Text for Shipbuilding, Theoretical and Practical at Google Books. Retrieved 4 Apr 2012.
 Obituary for Theodore D. Wilson in American Machinist, Volume 19 at Google Books. Retrieved 4 Apr 2012.

1840 births
1896 deaths
American naval architects
United States Navy officers
United States Naval Academy faculty